The 2020 elections for the Pennsylvania State Senate were held on November 3, 2020, with 25 of 50 districts being contested. Primary elections were held on June 2, 2020. The term of office for those elected in 2020 began when the Senate convened in January 2021. Pennsylvania State Senators are elected for four-year terms, with half of the seats up for election every two years.  The election coincided with the 2020 United States presidential election, United States House of Representatives elections, and the entirety of the Pennsylvania House of Representatives.

Republicans have controlled the chamber since the 1994 election ( years).

Special election

48th senatorial district 
A special election for the 48th senatorial district was held on January 14 following Republican State Senator Mike Folmer's resignation after being arrested for possession of child pornography. Democrats selected Lebanon Valley College associate professor Michael Schroeder as their nominee, while Republicans nominated Lebanon County District Attorney Dave Arnold.

Predictions

General election overview

Close races
Six district races had winning margins of less than 15%:

Results by district

See also
 2020 Pennsylvania elections
2020 Pennsylvania House of Representatives election
 Elections in Pennsylvania

References

External links
 
 
 
  (State affiliate of the U.S. League of Women Voters)
 

Senate
2020
Pennsylvania Senate
Pennsylvania special elections